Prosser is an English-language surname, derived from a Welsh-language patronym.

Origin
The English-language surname Prosser is considered to be a Welsh surname. The name originated as an Anglicisation of the Welsh-language ap Rhosier, or ap Rosser, both meaning son of Roger.

The English-language personal name Roger is derived from the Old French personal name Roger, Rogier. This personal name is of Germanic origin, derived from the elements hrōd ("fame") and gār, gēr ("spear"). The Old French name was adopted by the Normans, and was introduced into Britain by them in the Middle Ages (replacing the Old English cognate Hrōðgār). The name became one of the most popular masculine names in the Middle Ages, and lost popularity afterwards.

Until the Tudor period Welsh names generally took the format X son of Y, or X daughter of Y. The Old Welsh word for son was map, but it lenited to fap (today fab), then ap. Although some of the Welsh gentry began to adopt the English fashion for hereditary surnames even before the Act of Union between England and Wales in 1536, in general the Act marked the beginning of a gradual shift towards hereditary surnames in Wales that was not complete until the 18th century. In some cases ap was merged into the following personal name to create an hereditary name. So Ap Richard became Pritchard, ap Even became Bevan and ap Hugh emerged as Pugh. The shift from ap Rosser to Prosser is of this pattern, though the surname Rosser also occurs. The distribution of Prosser and Rosser in 1842-46 was strongly centred in south-east Wales, and largely absent from other parts of Wales.

Early examples of the surname include:

 1529 Richard ap Rosser was a party to two deeds relating to 'a mansion place called the Van' in Senghenydd.
 1556 Morgan Lewis ap Rosser was a party to a grant of land in Llywell, Co. Brecon.

Name distribution
There are various sources for surname maps charting the geographic distribution of surnames.

England and Wales

Ancestry.com's distribution map, based on their data from the 1891 England and Wales Census, shows Prossers were strongly present in southeast Wales and the western counties of England. Particularly high concentrations were in the Welsh historic counties of Glamorgan and Monmouthshire and the English county of Herefordshire.

Germany

German Prossers are primarily found in southern Germany.

Italy

The Italian Gens Project shows there are a small number of Prossers living in Italy. Their distribution map results show that the Prossers are concentrated in the northernmost province, Alto Adige/Südtirol.

United States

Current distribution maps from the Gens Project in the United States based on the 2000 US census demonstrate that the name is most common in eight states: California, Florida, Georgia, Illinois, New York, Ohio, Pennsylvania, and South Carolina, while still numbering less than a thousand individuals in each of those states.

Ancestry.com has a surname map for the name's distribution according to the United States Census for 1920. At that time, the name Prosser was most common in six states:  California, Illinois, New York, Ohio, Pennsylvania, and South Carolina, with a total of 93–183 Prosser households in each state. Using data based on 142 Prosser immigrants to New York, the vast majority departed from Great Britain, while 11 are from Ireland and 21 from Germany.

Notable people with the surname Prosser
 Bob Prosser, Welsh rugby union and rugby league player in the 1960s and 1970s
 Dai Prosser (1912–1973), Welsh rugby union and rugby league player
 David Prosser (bishop) (1868–1950), Welsh bishop, Archbishop of Wales 1944–49
 David Prosser Jr. (born 1942), American jurist and politician, former justice of the Wisconsin Supreme Court
 Erastus S. Prosser (1809–1887), American politician from New York
 Gabriel Prosser (1776–1800), rebel slave in 1800 Virginia
 Geoff Prosser (born 1948), Australian politician
 George Henry Prosser (1867–1941), Australian businessman and politician
 Glyn Prosser (1907–1972), Welsh international rugby player
 Gwyn Prosser (born 1943), British politician
 Halley H. Prosser (1870–1921), American politician from Michigan
 Hugh Prosser (1900–1952), American film actor
 Ian Prosser (born 1943), British businessman
 Ian Prosser (florist) (born 1957), Scottish born American florist
 Inez Beverly Prosser (1897–1934), American teacher and school administrator
 Joseph Prosser (1828–1867), Irish recipient of the Victoria Cross
 Julien Prosser (born 1972), Australian beach volleyball player
 Keith Prosser, (1897–1954), Bishop of Burnley
 Luke Prosser (born 1988), English footballer
 Margaret Prosser, Baroness Prosser (born 1937), British peer and politician
 Mrs. Prosser (1807–1882), British sentimental Victorian author
 Patrick Prosser (born 1952), Scottish computer scientist
 Ray Prosser (1927-2020), Welsh rugby player with Pontypool
 Richard Prosser (priest) (1748–1839), English priest
 Richard Bissell Prosser (1838–1918), English patent examiner and biographical writer
 Richard Prosser (born 1967), New Zealand politician
 Roy Prosser (1942–2008), Australian Rugby Union player
 Seward Prosser (1871–1942), American banker and philanthropist
 Skip Prosser (1950–2007), American college basketball coach
 Stuart Prosser (1887–1939), Welsh rugby union and professional rugby league footballer
 William Prosser, Lord Prosser (1934–2015), Scottish judge
 William Farrand Prosser (1834–1911), American politician
 William Henry Prosser (1870–1952), Welsh cricketer
 William Lloyd Prosser (1898–1972), American legal scholar

See also
 Prodger
 Prosser (disambiguation)
 Rosser (disambiguation)

References

Surnames of Welsh origin
Anglicised Welsh-language surnames
Patronymic surnames
Surnames from given names